Polyura jalysus, the Indian Yellow Nawab,  is a butterfly in the family Nymphalidae. It was described by Cajetan Felder and Rudolf Felder in 1867. It is found in the Indomalayan realm.

Subspecies
P. j. jalysus (Sumatra, Peninsular Malaya, Thailand, Vietnam)
P. j. ephebus (Fruhstorfer, 1914) (Burma, Thailand)
P. j. triphonus (Fruhstorfer, 1914) (Borneo)

References

External links
Polyura Billberg, 1820 at Markku Savela's Lepidoptera and Some Other Life Forms

Polyura
Butterflies described in 1867
Butterflies of Asia
Taxa named by Baron Cajetan von Felder
Taxa named by Rudolf Felder